Plush Home, Inc. is an American company that sells home furnishings and functions as an interior design firm. It was founded in 2003 by interior designer and furniture designer, Nina Petronzio and her husband, martial art expert Steven Ho.

The idea for the company came in 2002 when founder Nina Petronzio encountered difficulty finding high-end, luxury furniture with customizable options and short lead times for her clients. She built a flagship showroom on Melrose Avenue in West Hollywood, California in 2003 to resemble the interior of a high-end home.

Usage in popular culture
 In 2007, the Plush Home Tulip Dining Table and Park Avenue Console was used on the set of Spider-Man 3, in the restaurant scene where Peter Parker plans to propose to Mary Jane Watson.

References

External links
 Plush Home, Inc.
 Franklin Report

Furniture retailers of the United States
Companies based in Los Angeles
Home decor retailers
Privately held companies based in California
American companies established in 2003
Retail companies established in 2003
2003 establishments in California